ARV General Soublette (F-24) was the fourth ship of the Mariscal Sucre-class frigate of the Venezuelan Navy.

Development and design 

Venezuela ordered six Lupo-class frigates from CNR in 1975 as a replacement for older warships. These units were commissioned between 1980 and 1982. In general terms, their appearance and equipment is similar to those built for Peru, except for some differences in electronics and missiles. The other ships in Venezuelan service were expected to undergo an austere version of this upgrade, but three ships were eventually taken out of service.

Construction and career
General Soublette was laid down on 26 August 1978 and launched on 4 January 1980 by Cantieri Riuniti dell'Adriatico at Riva Trigoso. She was commissioned on 5 December 1981.

Over the years she has participated in multiple important naval exercises and has been the flagship of the multinational UNITAS exercise.

With the change of name of the Venezuelan naval force, the unit prefix changed from ARV (Armada de la República de Venezuela) to AB (Armada Bolivariana).

References

1980 ships
Lupo-class frigates
Ships built in Italy